Chantal Payer (born 25 July 1953) is a Canadian fencer. She competed in the women's individual and team foil events at the 1976 Summer Olympics.

References

1953 births
Living people
Canadian female fencers
Olympic fencers of Canada
Fencers at the 1976 Summer Olympics
Fencers from Montreal
Pan American Games medalists in fencing
Pan American Games silver medalists for Canada
Fencers at the 1979 Pan American Games
20th-century Canadian women